Catherine Black, MBE, RRC, SRN (12 June 1878– 7 October 1949), also known as "Blackie", served in World War I and was the private nurse to King George V.

Family and early life

Catherine Black was born on 12 June 1878 in  Ramelton, County Donegal in Ardeen House on the outskirts of the town. Her father was a linen draper with a prosperous shop in the town. Black went to Royal London Hospital to train as a nurse, and it was whilst there that she became friends with Edith Cavell. She died on 7 October 1949 in London.

World War I service

Black was working as a private nurse in Royal London Hospital when the outbreak of World War I was declared. She joined Queen Alexandra's Imperial Military Nursing Service, first serving in Cambridge Hospital in Aldershot and then the No. 7 Hospital in St Omer where she treated soldiers suffering from shell shock. Black was then sent as a replacement for a nurse who was killed at a casualty clearing station at Poperinghe, Belgium, and subsequently went on to serve at the 41st Stationary Hospital at Sailly-Lorette, nursing soldiers with self-inflicted wounds. She was moved to the No. 5 General Hospital in Rouen and various other clearing stations until the end of the war.

King George V

Sister Black was the private nurse of King George V from 1928 until his death in 1936. She began her service in late 1928 following a serious bout of illness for the King. Black was made permanent in 1930; she was given her own chambers within Buckingham Palace. She was known as "Blackie" to the members of the royal family. 

Black objected to the actions of the King's doctor Lord Dawson of Penn in administering a lethal combination of morphine and cocaine to hasten the King's death. The King's final words, "God damn you!", were addressed to Black as she gave him a sedative on the night before his death.

Black wrote of her life in the Palace in her autobiography King's Nurse, Beggar's Nurse, in which she also recounted her childhood in Donegal, nursing in Australia, as well as her service in WWI. In reflecting on the experiences of nurses in the war, Black recounted "you went into [a casualty-clearing station] young and light-hearted.  You came out older than any span of years could make you."

References

1878 births
1949 deaths
People from Ramelton
20th-century Irish women
Irish nurses
Irish people of World War I
Female nurses in World War I
Members of the Order of the British Empire